The Education Act 1901 (Renewal) Act 1902 (2 Edw. 7 c. 19) was an Act of Parliament of the Parliament of the United Kingdom.

It renewed the effects of the Education Act 1901 for a further year.

The Act was repealed, having since become obsolete, by the Education Act 1918.

References
The Public General Acts Passed in the Second Year of the Reign of His Majesty King Edward the Seventh. London: printed for His Majesty's Stationery Office. 1902.
Chronological table of the statutes; HMSO, London. 1993.

See also
Education Act

United Kingdom Acts of Parliament 1902
United Kingdom Education Acts